Juan Diego Tello Palacios (born 11 May 1985) is a Colombian professional basketball player for Libertadores de Querétaro of the Liga Nacional de Baloncesto Profesional (LNBP).

High school
Born in Medellín, Colombia, Palacios attended high school at Our Savior New American in Centereach, New York, United States. As a senior, he averaged 20.2 points, 9.3 rebounds, and 2.2 steals.

College career
Palacios played college basketball at the University of Louisville, from 2004 to 2008, averaging 8.9 points and 5.7 rebounds per game. He had hoped to become the first Colombian to play in the NBA, but he was not selected in the 2008 NBA draft. In the Louisville Media Guide, he listed former Cardinal player Francisco Garcia, as his favorite NBA player.

Professional career
After one year at CB Vic, where Palacios debuted as professional player, and two years playing on loan at UB La Palma, in LEB Oro, CB Gran Canaria added him to play in Spain's top-tier level Liga ACB, in 2011.
On 14 August 2013, he signed with Lietuvos Rytas, of the Lithuanian Basketball League. In August 2014, he signed a one-year deal with Pınar Karşıyaka.

On 15 February 2017, Palacios signed with Turkish club Tofaş, for the rest of the 2016–17 BSL season. On August 10, 2017, Palacios signed with Lithuanian club Neptūnas Klaipėda, for the 2017–18 season. On 2 January 2018, he moved to the Turkish club Beşiktaş. He signed with Élan Chalon of the French league on 20 July 2018. On 2 August 2019, Palacios signed a one-year deal with Spanish club Movistar Estudiantes.

Career statistics

EuroLeague

|-
| style="text-align:left;"| 2013–14
| style="text-align:left;"| Lietuvos Rytas
| 10 || 9 || 25.2 || .444 || .000 || .743 || 5.6 || 1.4 || .8 || 1.1 || 10.0 || 10.6

Domestic leagues

References

External links
 Euroleague.net Profile 
 Louisville Cardinals bio
 TBLStat.net Profile

1985 births
Living people
Basketball players from New York (state)
BC Rytas players
BC Neptūnas players
Beşiktaş men's basketball players
CB Estudiantes players
CB Gran Canaria players
CB Vic players
Centers (basketball)
Colombian expatriate basketball people in France
Colombian expatriate basketball people in Lithuania
Colombian expatriate basketball people in Spain
Colombian expatriate basketball people in the United States
Colombian men's basketball players
Élan Chalon players
Karşıyaka basketball players
Liga ACB players
Louisville Cardinals men's basketball players
Nanterre 92 players
People from Centereach, New York
Power forwards (basketball)
Sportspeople from Medellín
Sportspeople from Suffolk County, New York
Tofaş S.K. players
UB La Palma players
Titanes de Barranquilla players